The Instituto Nacional de Cancerología (National Cancer Institute, abbreviated INCan) is a public institution administered by the Mexican Secretariat of Health which specializes in the treatment of cancer. It is one of 12 specialized hospitals that provides public health services and trains new resident doctors. It was created on November 25, 1946, by then-President Manuel Ávila Camacho.

References

External links 
 Official web site of the Instituto Nacional de Cancerología
 Official pages for INCan at the Mexican Secretariat of Health web site

Oncology
Hospitals in Mexico